The transportation system of Hawaii is a cooperation of complex systems of infrastructure.

Background

Transit systems

Rail
At one time, Hawaii had a network of railroads on each of the larger islands that helped move farm commodities as well as passengers. These railroads were all  narrow gauge for the majority although there were some  gauge on some of the smaller islands – standard US gauge is ).  The largest by far was the Oahu Railway and Land Company (OR&L) which ran multiple lines from Honolulu across the western and northern part of Oahu.  The OR&L was an important player moving troops and goods during World War II.  Traffic on this line was busy enough that there were signals on the lines facilitating movement of trains and wigwag signals at some railroad crossings for the protection of motorists.  The mainline was officially abandoned in 1947, although part of it was bought by the US Navy and operated until 1970.  Thirteen miles (21 km) of track remain and preservationists occasionally run trains over a portion of this line.

Bus
Each major island has a public bus system.

Roads and freeways
A system of state highways encircles each main island. Only Oahu has federal highways, and is the only area outside the contiguous 48 states to have signed Interstate highways. Travel can be slow due to narrow winding roads, and congestion in cities.

Bridges and tunnels
 Admiral Clarey Bridge, also known as the Ford Island Bridge, is a floating concrete drawbridge providing access to Ford Island, a United States Navy installation situated in the middle of Pearl Harbor. The causeway bridge was completed and opened in 1998, named the Admiral Clarey Bridge after former Admiral Bernard A. Clarey.
 Hospital Rock Tunnels are a small pair of highway tunnels passing through a ridge on the edge of the Ko‘olau Range on the island of O‘ahu, Hawaiʻi, USA. The tunnels are "cut and cover" tunnels.
 John H. Wilson Tunnels are a pair of highway tunnels passing through the Ko‘olau Range on the island of O‘ahu.  The tunnels are located on Likelike Highway (Route 63), which connects Kāneʻohe with Honolulu, and are 2775 feet (845.8 m) long westbound and 2813 feet (857.4 m) long eastbound.
 Nu‘uanu Pali Tunnels are a set of four highway tunnels (two in each direction) on the Pali Highway (Hawaii State Highway 61) which pass through the Nuuanu Pali.  These tunnels serve as one of three trans-Koolau routes between Honolulu (leeward Oahu) and the communities of windward Oahu.
Also, the Nuuanu Pali Tunnels serve as a major transportation route from Kaneohe & Kailua over to Honolulu.
 Tetsuo Harano Tunnels are a pair of highway tunnels passing through the Ko‘olau Range on the island of O‘ahu.

Private automobiles

Ferries
Private steamships and ferries were the sole way of traveling between the islands from the 19th century until the 1950s. Seaflite operated hydrofoils between the major islands between 1975 and 1978. The Hawaii Superferry operated between Oahu and Maui between December 2007 and March 2009, with additional routes planned for other islands. Legal issues over environmental impact statements and protests ended the service, though the company operating Superferry has expressed a wish to begin ferry service again at a future date. Currently there is passenger ferry service in Maui County between Moloka'i and Maui, and between Lana'i and Maui, though neither of these takes vehicles. Norwegian Cruise Lines also provides passenger cruise ship service between the islands.

Pedestrians, and bicycles

Airports

Honolulu International Airport is the major commercial aviation hub of Hawaii, with intercontinental services to North America, Asia and Oceania. Within Hawaii, Hawaiian Airlines, Mokulele Airlines and go! use jets between the larger airports in Honolulu, Līhue, Kahului, Kona and Hilo, while Island Air and Pacific Wings serve smaller airports. These airlines also provide air freight service between the islands.

See also

 Aviation in Hawaii
 Plug-in electric vehicles in Hawaii

References

 
Transportation planning